Hopkins is an English, Welsh and Irish patronymic surname. The English name means "son of Hob". Hob was a diminutive of Robert, itself deriving from the Germanic warrior name Hrod-berht, translated as "renowned-fame". The Robert spelling was introduced to England and Scotland after the Norman conquest of England.

The surname Hopkins or Hopcyn is associated with, and most common in Wales. A typical Welsh patronym, it is first recorded as ab Popkyn (son of Hopkin) in Monmouth, in the early 17th century, and became a standardized surname under English law.

The name in Ireland is an Anglicisation of the Irish Gaelic surname Mac Oibicin.

People surnamed Hopkins
 Anna Hopkins (born 1987), Canadian actress
 Andrew Delmar Hopkins (1857–1948), American entomologist
 Sir Anthony Hopkins (born 1937), actor
 Antony Hopkins, composer
 A. G. Hopkins Antony Gerald Hopkins, British historian
 Arthur F. Hopkins (1794–1865), husband of Juliet Opie Hopkins
 Bernard Hopkins, professional boxer
 Bert Hopkins, Australian cricketer
 Bobb Hopkins, actor, director and founder of the National Hobo Association
 Brad Hopkins, NFL offensive lineman
 Brycen Hopkins (born 1997), American football player & son of Brad
 Budd Hopkins, artist and UFO researcher
 Cathy Hopkins, novelist
 Charles Hopkins (disambiguation), several people
 Christian Hopkins, American football player
 Claude Hopkins, musician
 Claude C. Hopkins, advertising man
 Constance Hopkins, Mayflower passenger
 CJ Hopkins, American playwright and author
 DeAndre Hopkins (born 1992), American football player
 Dustin Hopkins, American football player
 Edward Hopkins, settler, governor Connecticut Colony
 Edward John Hopkins, English organist and composer
 Esek Hopkins (1718–1802), Continental Navy officer
 Esther A. Hopkins, American chemist and environmental attorney
 Ezekiel Hopkins, Bishop of Derry and Raphoe
 Frank Hopkins, U.S. cowboy
 Frank Hopkins (Royal Navy officer), Captain of HMS Ark Royal
 Frederick Gowland Hopkins, biochemist, Nobel Prize laureate
 Gail Hopkins (born 1943), American baseball player and coach
 Gareth Hopkins, New Zealand cricketer
 Gareth Hopkins (footballer)
 Gaynor Hopkins, stage name Bonnie Tyler (born 1951), singer
 George Hopkins (disambiguation), several people
 Gerard Manley Hopkins, poet, Jesuit
 Graham Hopkins, drummer/musician
 Harold Hopkins (physicist), physicist
 Harry Hopkins, economics advisor to Franklin D. Roosevelt
 Herbert Hopkins, Australian/English cricketer
 Ian Hopkins, British police chief
 Isaac S. Hopkins, professor/founder Georgia Institute of Technology
 J. Fletcher Hopkins (died 1953), American politician
 James Hopkins (disambiguation), several people
 Jeff Hopkins, footballer
 Jeffrey Hopkins, Tibetologist
 John Hopkins (disambiguation), several people
 Johns Hopkins, philanthropist
 Jon Hopkins, electronica musician
 Juliet Opie Hopkins (1818–1890), The Florence Nightingale of the south.
 Katie Hopkins, British TV personality and newspaper columnist
 Keith Hopkins, historian and sociologist
 Larry J. Hopkins (1933–2021), American politician
 Lemuel Hopkins (1750–1801), American poet
 Lightnin' Hopkins, blues guitarist and singer
 Linda Ann Hopkins (born 1976) known as Tera Patrick, pornographic actress
 Lisa Hopkins (born 1978), American opera singer
 Livingston Hopkins "Hop" (1846–1927), American-born cartoonist in Australia
 Mark Hopkins (disambiguation), several people
 Mary Hopkins (disambiguation), several people
 Matthew Hopkins, 17th century witch-hunter
 Maudie Hopkins, last surviving American Civil War widow
 Mel Hopkins (1934–2010), international footballer
 Michael Hopkins (disambiguation), several people
 Milton Hopkins (biologist) (1906–1983), American botanist and textbook editor
 Milton N. Hopkins (1926–2007), farmer and ornithologist
 Milton W. Hopkins (1789–1844), American portrait painter
 Miriam Hopkins (1902–1972), American actress
 Nathan T. Hopkins, U.S. Representative from Kentucky
 Neil Hopkins, (born 1977) American actor 
 Nelson K. Hopkins, New York State Comptroller, 1872–1875
 Nicky Hopkins (1944–1994), English rock pianist 
 Patty Hopkins (born 1942), British architect
 Paul Hopkins (baseball) (1904–2004), baseball pitcher
 Paul Hopkins (actor) (born 1968), Canadian television, film and theatre actor
 Paul Hopkins (footballer) (born 1986), English (soccer) footballer
 Peter W. Hopkins (1826–1879), New York politician
 Rachel Hopkins, British Member of Parliament elected 2019
 Richard Hopkins (disambiguation), several people
 Rob Hopkins (born 1968), English activist founder of Transition Towns movement
 Ron Hopkins (born 1960), American football player
 Roy M. Hopkins (1943–2006), member of the Louisiana House of Representatives
 Stephen Hopkins (disambiguation), several people
Stephen Hopkins (politician) (1707–1785) governor, Rhode Island; signer, Declaration of Independence
 Telma Hopkins, actress/singer
 Tom Hopkins, English footballer
 Tim Hopkins, jazz musician
 Wes Hopkins, NFL defensive back
 William Hopkins (disambiguation), several people
William Hersey Hopkins (1841–1919), American academic and college administrator

Fictional characters 
 Jimmy Hopkins, main character of the controversial video game Bully
 Gilly Hopkins, main character of The Great Gilly Hopkins.
 Martin Hopkins, main character of the Pentagram series by Anthony Horowitz.

See also
 Hopkin
 Hopkinson

References

English-language surnames
Patronymic surnames
Surnames from given names